Kauko Wilhelm Wahlsten (9 December 1923 – 9 May 2001) was a Finnish rower who competed in the 1952 Summer Olympics.

He was born in Kymi, Kymenlaakso and died in Kotka.

In 1952 he was a crew member of the Finnish boat which won the bronze medal in the coxless fours event.

External links
 profile

1923 births
2001 deaths
Finnish male rowers
Olympic rowers of Finland
Rowers at the 1952 Summer Olympics
Olympic bronze medalists for Finland
Olympic medalists in rowing
Medalists at the 1952 Summer Olympics
Sportspeople from Kymenlaakso